Madagascarina is a genus of flies in the family Stratiomyidae.

Distribution
Madagascar.

Species
Madagascarina beyeri Lindner, 1967

References

Stratiomyidae
Brachycera genera
Taxa named by Erwin Lindner
Diptera of Africa
Endemic fauna of Madagascar